Yum China Holdings, Inc. is a Chinese Fortune 500 fast-food restaurant company based in Shanghai, China. With US$9.5 billion in revenue and 10,600 restaurants worldwide it is one of the largest restaurant companies. It was spun off from Yum! Brands in 2016, becoming an independent, publicly traded company on November 1, 2016. Yum China is a trademark licensee of Yum Brands, paying 3% of total systemwide sales to Yum Brands. It operates 8,484 restaurants in over 1,100 cities located in every province and autonomous region in Mainland China. It has a workforce of 450,000 employees. Since the stock is listed on the New York Stock Exchange, the company has an office in Plano, Texas for SEC filings.

History

Initial foray into China

Spinoff
On October 25, 2015, Yum! Brands announced that it intended to separate into two independent, publicly traded companies by spinning off Yum China; it took effect 1 November 2016.

Brands

Yum China has several subsidiary brands, including KFC, Taco Bell, Pizza Hut, COFFii & JOY a coffee bar launched in 2018, Huang Ji Huang a casual dining franchise, East Dawning a Jiangnan cuisine fast food franchise and Little Sheep. Little Sheep has around 200 restaurants in China, twenty-nine in nine US states, mostly in California, seventeen in Japan, nine in Canada and one in Jakarta, Indonesia.

Number of units 2022:
 8,441 KFC
 2,679 Pizza Hut
 997 Little Sheep, East Dawning, Taco Bell, Huang Ji Huang, COFFii & Joy, Lavazza, and Shaofaner.

Corporate affairs
The headquarters is in the Yum China Building in Xuhui District.

References

External links

Companies listed on the New York Stock Exchange
Companies listed on the Hong Kong Stock Exchange
Corporate spin-offs
Companies based in Shanghai
Restaurants established in 2016
Yum! Brands